Oak Creek Township, Nebraska may refer to the following places:

Oak Creek Township, Butler County, Nebraska
Oak Creek Township, Saunders County, Nebraska

Nebraska township disambiguation pages